Ismaël Diomandé may refer to:
 Ismaël Diomandé (footballer, born 1992)
 Ismaël Diomandé (footballer, born 2003)